Charpentier is the French word for "carpenter", and it is also a French surname; a variant spelling is Carpentier.  In English, the equivalent word and name is "Carpenter"; in German, "Zimmermann"; in Dutch, "Timmerman".

The origin of the name dates to 900–1000, when the Old French "Charpentier" derived from the Late Latin carpentarius artifex ("carpenter" or "wainwright"), equivalent to Latin carpent(um), meaning "two-wheeled carriage" (perhaps ultimately derived from Celtic—consider Old Irish carpad, "chariot"), suffixed with arius ("-ary"); see ER2.

Persons with the surname

Visual arts
 Alexandre Charpentier (1856–1909), French sculptor
 Constance Marie Charpentier (1767–1849), French painter
 Elisa Beetz-Charpentier (1859-1949), French sculptor
 Jean-Marie Charpentier (1939-2010), French architect
 Marguerite Charpentier (1848-1904), French art collector and salonist

Composers & musicians
 Marc-Antoine Charpentier (1643–1704), French composer of much sacred vocal music including Te Deum (Charpentier), and Molière's last collaborator
 Jean-Jacques Beauvarlet-Charpentier (28 June 1734 – 6 May 1794)  French organist and composer, father of Jacques-Marie (1766–1834), also an organist and composer
 Gustave Charpentier (1860–1956), French composer of Louise (opera)
 Gabriel Charpentier (born 1925), Canadian composer (see Canadian encyclopedia entry)
 Jacques Charpentier (1933–2017), French composer and organist

Politicians
 Gilles Charpentier (born 1927), French politician
 Léon Charpentier (1859–1945), French politician
 Victor-Therese Charpentier (1732–1776), French governor-general of Saint-Domingue

Scientists
 Augustin Charpentier  (1852–1916), French physician, investigator of size-weight illusion
 Emmanuelle Charpentier (born 1968), French researcher in Microbiology, Genetics and Biochemistry
 François Charpentier (1620–1702), French archaeologist and scholar
 François-Philippe Charpentier (1734–1817), French engraver and inventor
 Johann von or Jean de Charpentier (1786–1855), German-Swiss geologist, namesake of the Antarctic Charpentier Pyramid 
 Johann Friedrich Wilhelm de Charpentier (1738–1805), the father of both Toussaint and Johann/Jean
 Marie Charpentier (1903–1994), mathematician
 Toussaint de Charpentier (1779–1847), German geologist and entomologist

Soldiers
 Henri François Marie Charpentier (1769–1831), French general of the Napoleonic Wars

Writers
 Fulgence Charpentier (1897–2001), Canadian journalist, editor and publisher

Athletes
 Sébastien Charpentier (born 1973), French motorcycle racer
 Sébastien Charpentier (born 1977), Canadian ice hockey player
 Gabriel Charpentier (born 1999), Congolese-born French association football player

Other
 Henri Charpentier (183?-1888), namesake of a lake and town in North Dakota
 Georges Charpentier (1846-1905), 19th century French publisher

See also

Charpentier River in Northern Quebec, Canada

References

French-language surnames
Occupational surnames